Stephen Kelly Petterson  (born 2 August 1957) is a competitive rifle shooter from New Zealand.

Petterson was born in Auckland in 1957. A veteran of four Olympic Games and five Commonwealth Games, he has won a total of four gold medals and a silver medal at the Commonwealth Games. He was the flag bearer for New Zealand at the closing ceremony of the 1994 Commonwealth Games.

In the 1999 New Year Honours, Petterson was appointed a Member of the New Zealand Order of Merit, for services to smallbore rifle shooting.

References

New Zealand male sport shooters
Living people
1957 births
Commonwealth Games gold medallists for New Zealand
Commonwealth Games silver medallists for New Zealand
Shooters at the 1986 Commonwealth Games
Shooters at the 1990 Commonwealth Games
Shooters at the 1994 Commonwealth Games
Shooters at the 1998 Commonwealth Games
Shooters at the 2002 Commonwealth Games
Olympic shooters of New Zealand
Shooters at the 1984 Summer Olympics
Shooters at the 1988 Summer Olympics
Shooters at the 1992 Summer Olympics
Shooters at the 1996 Summer Olympics
Members of the New Zealand Order of Merit
Commonwealth Games medallists in shooting
Medallists at the 1990 Commonwealth Games
Medallists at the 1994 Commonwealth Games
Medallists at the 1998 Commonwealth Games